Anastasiya Georgievna Galustyan (born 25 June 1999) is a Russian-Armenian figure skater who represents Armenia in ladies' singles. She is the 2014 CS Warsaw Cup silver medalist, the 2019 Santa Claus Cup champion, the 2015 CS Warsaw Cup bronze medalist, the 2016 Toruń Cup silver medalist, and the 2014 Tallinn Trophy silver medalist.

She placed 10th at the 2016 Winter Youth Olympics.

Personal life 
Galustyan was born 25 June 1999 in Moscow, Russia. Both of her parents are figure skating coaches.

Career 
Galustyan originally competed for Russia, but has represented Armenia since 2012.

2013–2014 season 
Galustyan debuted on the ISU Junior Grand Prix (JGP) series, finishing 7th in Košice, Slovakia in September 2013, and 10th in Ostrava, Czech Republic the next month. She made her senior international debut in December, placing 5th at the Ukrainian Open. In March 2014, she competed at her first ISU Championship, the World Junior Championships in Sofia, Bulgaria, but was eliminated after placing 27th in the short program.

2014–2015 season 
During the 2014 JGP series, Galustyan placed 8th in Tallinn, Estonia, and 12th in Zagreb, Croatia. Competing on the senior level, she finished 6th at the 2014 Volvo Open Cup and won silver at the 2014 Warsaw Cup, both ISU Challenger Series (CS) events, and then took silver at the Tallinn Trophy. In January 2015, she placed 7th at the European Youth Olympic Festival in Austria and then qualified for the first time to an ISU Championship free skate, at the European Championships in Stockholm, Sweden, where she finished 13th.

In March, Galustyan finished 12th at the World Junior Championships in Tallinn, Estonia, but missed the cut-off for the free skate at the World Championships in Shanghai, China, having placed 29th in the short program.

2015–2016 season 
Competing in the 2015 JGP series, Galustyan placed 11th in Colorado Springs, Colorado and 9th in Logroño, Spain. She then appeared at a pair of Challenger Series events, placing fourth at the 2015 Mordovian Ornament and taking bronze at the 2015 Warsaw Cup. In January 2016, she won silver at the Toruń Cup and finished 15th at the European Championships in Bratislava, Slovakia, having placed 16th in the short program and 13th in the free skate.

In February, Galustyan represented Armenia at the 2016 Winter Youth Olympics in Lillehammer, placing 7th in the short, 11th in the free, and 10th overall. In March, she finished 16th at the 2016 World Junior Championships in Debrecen, Hungary, after ranking 9th in the short and 16th in the free. In April, she placed 20th in the short, 24th in the free, and 24th overall at the 2016 World Championships in Boston.

2016–2017 season 
After finishing ninth at the 2016 CS Autumn Classic International, Galustyan debuted on the ISU Grand Prix of Figure Skating circuit, placing 9th at the 2016 Rostelecom Cup and 11th at the 2016 Trophée de France.

At the 2017 European Figure Skating Championships in Ostrava, Galustyan finished in a career-high placement of 12th. Later in Helsinki, she concluded the season with a 23rd place finish at the 2017 World Figure Skating Championships.

2017–2018 season 
Galustyan began the 2017-18 season at the 2017 CS Lombardia Trophy, finishing in 19th place. At the 2017 CS Nebelhorn Trophy, Galustyan failed to qualify Armenia a place to the 2018 Winter Olympics. After placing 15th in the short program, Galustyan jumped to 7th in the free program, finishing 8th overall and one place short of an Olympic qualifying position. Armenia is subsequently the first alternate for a place in ladies singles at the Olympic Games.

On the 2017–18 ISU Grand Prix of Figure Skating circuit, Galustyan placed 12th at the Rostelecom Cup.

On 14 January, 2018, she withdrew from the 2018 European Figure Skating Championships in Moscow, Russia.

Programs

Competitive highlights 
GP: Grand Prix; CS: Challenger Series; JGP: Junior Grand Prix

References

External links 
 

1999 births
Living people
Armenian figure skaters
Russian people of Armenian descent
Figure skaters from Moscow
Figure skaters at the 2016 Winter Youth Olympics
Competitors at the 2019 Winter Universiade